Curtis Gillespie (born 1960) is a Canadian writer from Edmonton, Alberta, most noted as the winner of the Danuta Gleed Literary Award in 1998 for his short story collection The Progress of an Object in Motion.

Born and raised in Alberta, Gillespie went to Scotland to study history at the University of St. Andrews before returning to Canada. He has been a freelance writer for various publications, including Alberta Views, Saturday Night and the Edmonton Journal, founded the magazine Eighteen Bridges, and has been an educator and writer in residence at the University of Alberta and Grant MacEwan University. He has won several National Magazine Awards for his magazine writing.

The Progress of an Object in Motion was published by Coteau Books in 1997. In addition to the Danuta Gleed award, the book also won the Henry Kreisel Award for best first book from the Alberta Literary Awards, and was a nominee for the Howard O'Hagan Award for short stories. 

He followed in 2000 with Someone Like That: Life Stories, a collection of non-fiction profiles of people with developmental disabilities whom he had met in his past work as a case worker with Alberta's Catholic Social Services. The following year he and his family returned to Scotland for a year, following which he published the 2002 memoir Playing Through: A Year of Life and Links Along the Scottish Coast, which he described as "the golf version of A Year in Provence".

In 2007 he published the novel Crown Shyness, about a political journalist's interactions with a far-right politician. The novel was a nominee for the ReLit Awards in 2008.

He published Almost There: The Family Vacation, Then and Now in 2012.

He has also been an editor of various anthologies of non-fiction writing, including Perceptions of Promise: Biotechnology, Society and Art (2011, with Sean Caulfield and Timothy Caulfield), Imagining Ancient Women (2012, with Annabel Lyon) and Ten Canadian Writers in Context (2016, with Marie J. Carrière and Jason Purcell).

References

1960 births
Living people
20th-century Canadian short story writers
20th-century Canadian non-fiction writers
20th-century Canadian male writers
21st-century Canadian short story writers
21st-century Canadian non-fiction writers
21st-century Canadian novelists
21st-century Canadian male writers
Canadian male short story writers
Canadian male novelists
Canadian male non-fiction writers
Canadian memoirists
Canadian magazine writers
Writers from Edmonton